Norman is an  extinct town in southeastern Phelps County, in the U.S. state of Missouri.

A post office called Norman was established in 1888, and remained in operation until 1926. The community has the name of a local family.

References

Ghost towns in Missouri
Former populated places in Phelps County, Missouri